Hongik University Station is a station on the Seoul Subway Line 2 as well as the AREX and the Gyeongui-Jungang Line. As its name indicates, it serves the nearby Hongik University. It was formerly known as Donggyo Station, after the neighborhood that it serves.

As of December 2010, it has become a transfer station to the AREX and also was connected to the Gyeongui–Jungang Line.

Gallery

Vicinity
The Hongdae area around the station and the university is notable for its urban street arts and indie music culture, clubs and entertainment. It also serves Incheon International Airport.

Line 2
 Exit 4: access to the eponymous coffee shop used as filming location for 2007 Munhwa Broadcasting Corporation (MBC) television drama The 1st Shop of Coffee Prince
 Exit 6: access to Hongdae Playground Park
 Exit 9: known as a busy meeting area.

See also 
 Hongdae area

References

External links
 Station information from Korail

Metro stations in Mapo District
Seoul Metropolitan Subway stations
Railway stations opened in 1984
Hongik University
Railway stations at university and college campuses
1984 establishments in South Korea
20th-century architecture in South Korea